Tarn Mann is an Indian writer, producer and director. Born and raised in India, he moved to Canada at a young age.

Work
Mann worked with Bollywood actor Om Parkash as a child artist before becoming the assistant director of 'Mirza – The Untold Story', a film made in the Punjabi language. He wrote, produced and directed his first short film called 'Cars Weed God' in English a story based on three friends and how they end up in Heaven facing God asking questions about existence of human beings.

His début feature is called Rupinder Gandhi – The Gangster..?, based on a true story which became a hit in India though without any major stars.

References

21st-century Indian film directors
Living people
Year of birth missing (living people)